Ikoma-Loïs Openda (born 16 February 2000) is a Belgian professional footballer who plays as a striker for Ligue 1 club Lens and the Belgium national team.

Club career
Openda played as a youth for Patro Othee FC and RFC Liège before joining the youth academy of Standard Liège. In 2015, he moved to the academy of Club Brugge, where he made his senior debut on 10 August 2018 in the Belgian Pro League against Kortrijk. Openda replaced Jelle Vossen after 80 minutes.

On 21 July 2020, Openda joined Dutch Eredivisie club Vitesse on a season-long loan deal. He scored his first goal for the club on 3 October, in a 3–0 win over Heracles Almelo. Vitesse reached the final of the KNVB Cup, but lost 1–2 to Ajax. Openda scored the only goal for the Arnhem-based team. In June 2021, Openda rejoined Vitesse on loan for another season.

On 6 July 2022, Lens announced the signing of Openda on a five year deal from Club Brugge. The striker scored his first goal against Inter Milan in a friendly game on 22 July 2022. On 28 October, he scored his first hat-trick for Lens in a 3–0 win over Toulouse. After eight matches without scoring, on 12 March 2023, he scored the fastest hat-trick in Ligue 1 within four minutes and 30 seconds in a 4–0 away win over Clermont Foot, beating previous record of Matt Moussilou.

International career
On 18 May 2022, Openda was named to the squad for the four 2022–23 UEFA Nations League matches on 3, 8, 10 and 13 June 2022 against Netherlands, Poland (twice) and Wales respectively.
He played again against Wales in the UEFA Nations League on 13 September 2022. 

On 10 November 2022, he was named in the final squad for the 2022 FIFA World Cup in Qatar.

Personal life
Openda was born in Belgium and is of Moroccan and Congolese descent.

Career statistics

Club

International

''Scores and results list Belgium's goal tally first.

Honours
Club Brugge
 Belgian League: 2019–20
 Belgian Super Cup: 2018

Individual
Eredivisie Player of the Month: May 2022
Eredivisie Team of the Month: May 2022

References

External links
 
 
 

2000 births
Living people
Footballers from Liège
Belgian footballers
Belgium under-21 international footballers
Belgium youth international footballers
Belgian sportspeople of Moroccan descent
Belgian people of Democratic Republic of the Congo descent
Association football forwards
Club Brugge KV players
SBV Vitesse players
RC Lens players
Belgian Pro League players
Eredivisie players
Ligue 1 players
2022 FIFA World Cup players
Belgian expatriate footballers
Belgian expatriate sportspeople in the Netherlands
Expatriate footballers in the Netherlands
Belgian expatriate sportspeople in France
Expatriate footballers in France